Jeevan Thiagarajah is a Sri Lankan Tamil civil servant, human rights activist, social activist who is also the current Governor of the Northern Province.

Career 
He served as the chairman of the Institute for Human Rights, a Sri Lankan NGO and also worked as the Executive Director of the Consortium of Humanitarian Agencies.

Jeevan Thiagarajah has worked in the NGO sector in Sri Lanka since 1984, holding executive positions in several humanitarian and human rights organizations. In December 2020, he was appointed as the member of the Election Commission of Sri Lanka.

In October 2021, he resigned from the role of being a member of the Election Commission in order to take up the post of Northern Province Governor. He was sworn in as Governor of the Northern Province on 11 October 2021.

References

External links 

 Evolving Role of the NGO Sector in the Post-Tsunami Recovery of Sri Lanka
 voices of reconciliation
 Jeevan Thiagarajah
 Fears for Sri Lanka human rights
 European parliament Committee on Development

Governors of Northern Province, Sri Lanka
Living people
Sri Lankan human rights activists
Sri Lankan Tamil civil servants
Year of birth missing (living people)